is a 2000 Japanese film about a one-man fight against a terrorist attack at a dam in Japan, starring Yūji Oda (織田裕二) and Nanako Matsushima (松嶋菜々子). It is a Die Hard-style movie made in Japan.

Plot
It was an ordinary rescue mission for dam controller Togashi Teruo (Yūji Oda) and his colleague Yoshioka Kazushi as they set out to assist a few climbers who met an unexpected blizzard near the Okutowa Dam. Unfortunately, Yoshioka was injured while helping the others and Togashi had no choice but to seek help alone. Things got worse when WHITEOUT - a meteorological phenomenon – appeared and Togashi lost his best friend forever.

Meanwhile, with the most advanced technology, Utsuki Hirotaka (Koichi Sato) and his group of terrorists blow up the only main road to Okutowa Dam, the largest dam in Japan. They take over the dam along with the workers as hostages. They demanded JPY 5 billion from the government with a 24-hour deadline. To let the government know that they mean business, they decide to kill the hostages one by one unless they hear a definite answer from the highest government official. Among the hostages is Hirakawa Chiaki (Nanako Matsushima), Yoshioka’s fiancée whom Togashi promised his best friend to take good care of if anything bad should happen to him.

To make things more complicated, there was a snowstorm and no one can get in or out from the dam. Either the government pays the ransom or the dam will blow up along with the 200,000 residents living close to it. Fortunately, Togashi was not captured by the terrorists and he is now on his own to fight the well-equipped terrorists and to rescue both Hirakawa and the Okutowa Dam alone.

Release
Whiteout was released in Japan on 19 August 2000 where it was distributed by Toho.

Awards and nominations
2001 Awards of the Japanese Academy
 Best Sound - Osamu Onodera
 Best Supporting Actor - Kōichi Satō
 Nomination - Best Actor - Yūji Oda
 Nomination - Best Actress - Nanako Matsushima
 Nomination - Best Art Direction - Fumio Ogawa 
 Nomination - Best Cinematography - Hideo Yamamoto
 Nomination - Best Director - Setsurou Wakamatsu
 Nomination - Best Editing - Yoshifumi Fukazawa
 Nomination - Best Film
 Nomination - Best Lighting - Yoshikazu Motohashi
 Nomination - Best Music Score - Ken Ishii

2001 Blue Ribbon Awards
 Best Actor - Yūji Oda

Hochi Film Awards
 Best Actor - Yūji Oda

2001 Mainichi Film Award
 Best Film - Setsurou Wakamatsu

2001 Nikkan Sports Film Award
 Ishihara Yujiro Award

References

Footnotes

Sources

External links
 

Japanese action thriller films
2000 films
2000 action thriller films
Films directed by Setsurō Wakamatsu
2000s Japanese films
2000s Japanese-language films